Actaea pachypoda, the white baneberry or doll's-eyes, is a species of flowering plant in the genus Actaea, of the family Ranunculaceae.

The plant is native to eastern North America, in eastern Canada, and the Midwestern and Eastern United States. It prefers clay to coarse loamy upland soils, and is found in hardwood and mixed forest stands.

Description

The plant's most striking feature is its fruit, a  diameter white berry, whose size, shape, and black stigma scar give the species its other common name, "doll's eyes". The pedicels thicken and become bright red as the berries develop. 

The berries ripen over the summer, turning into fruits that persists on the plant until frost.

There are pink- and red-berried plants that have been called A. pachypoda forma rubrocarpa, but some of them produce infertile seed, and may actually be hybrids with Actaea rubra.

The specific name pachypoda means "thick foot", from Ancient Greek   "thick" and   "foot", which could refer to the large rhizome of the plant  or to the stalks supporting the berries, which are thicker than the closely related Actaea rubra.

Toxins
Both the berries and the entire plant are considered poisonous to humans. The berries contain cardiogenic toxins which can have an immediate sedative effect on human cardiac muscle tissue, and are the most poisonous part of the plant. Ingestion of the berries can lead to cardiac arrest and death.

Ecology

A variety of birds, which are not affected by the toxins, eat the berries and help disperse the seeds. Long-tongued bees collect pollen from the flowers.

Cultivation
Actaea pachypoda is cultivated as an ornamental plant, in traditional and wildlife gardens.

It requires part or full shade, rich loamy soil, and regular water with good drainage to reproduce its native habitat.

See also
 List of poisonous plants

References

 Karen Legasy, Shayna LaBelle-Beadman and Brenda Chambers.  Forest Plants of Northeastern Ontario.  Lone Pine Publishing / Queen's Printer for Ontario, 1995.
 Edible and Medicinal plants of the West, Gregory L. Tilford,

External links 

 Missouri Botanical Garden Plantfinder Actaea pachypoda
 Bioimages: Actaea pachypoda

pachypoda
Flora of Eastern Canada
Flora of the Northeastern United States
Flora of the North-Central United States
Flora of the Southeastern United States
Flora of the Appalachian Mountains
Flora of the Great Lakes region (North America)
Plants described in 1821